Anderson Luiz de Carvalho (born 19 July 1981), known as Nenê, is a Brazilian professional footballer who plays for Vasco da Gama. An attacking midfielder, he is mostly known for his crossing and dribbling ability, also being a free kick specialist.

He played most of his professional career in Spain, representing four clubs and amassing La Liga totals of 140 games and 23 goals over the course of four seasons, and France, where he appeared with Monaco and Paris Saint-Germain for 142 Ligue 1 matches in four and a half campaigns (55 goals).

Nenê won the 2013 national championship with PSG, also being chosen the league's best foreign player in 2010 while with Monaco. He also spent three months in England, with West Ham United.

Club career

Early career
Born in Jundiaí, São Paulo, Nenê started playing professionally with local Etti Jundiaí at the age of 19. On 16 May 2002 he moved to Palmeiras, on loan until December.

Nenê made his Série A debut on 11 August 2002, starting and scoring the first in a 1–1 home draw against Grêmio. He finished the year with five league goals, but his club suffered relegation for the first time in its history.

On 27 January 2003, Nenê signed for Santos still in the top division. Mainly a backup option to Robinho and Ricardo Oliveira, he still scored three goals during the team's Copa Libertadores run, and also appeared in both legs of the finals as a substitute.

Spain

In 2003–04, Nenê moved to Spain, first with RCD Mallorca – making his La Liga debut on 14 September 2003 in a 0–4 away loss against Athletic Bilbao– and then Deportivo Alavés. With the Basque side he put up two extraordinary individual seasons, with 21 goals in the league alone, playing his first year in the second division and achieving promotion.

After being relegated from the top level with Alavés in 2006, Nenê met the same fate with RC Celta de Vigo, again appearing in all 38 league games and totalling nearly 3,000 minutes of action for the Galicians.

Monaco
On 22 August 2007, Nenê was transferred to AS Monaco FC for an undisclosed fee. A year later, having already started with the French, he joined RCD Espanyol in the last days of the summer transfer window on a one-year loan, with a buying option for the Catalans at the season's end, which was finally not activated.

Back with Monaco, Nenê began the new campaign in impressive scoring fashion, scoring nine goals in his first ten matches – this included a brace against US Boulogne in a 3–1 away victory, both from long-range free kicks, as he led the scoring charts for a lengthy period of time.

Paris Saint-Germain

On 11 July 2010, Nenê joined Paris Saint-Germain in a deal believed to be around €5.5 million. "I'm very happy to have signed for Paris," the player told PSG's official website, adding: "Like PSG, I'm hoping to have a big league season and to pull something off in the Europa League". He scored in his first official appearance, a 3–1 home win against AS Saint-Étienne, adding two on 11 September against newly promoted AC Arles-Avignon (4–0, home). Halfway through the season he had already registered 13 goals, making him the third-highest scorer only behind Moussa Sow and Kevin Gameiro; his displays, free-kick ability and attacking flair earned him comparisons with Ronaldinho, a compatriot who played at the Parc des Princes earlier in the decade, but he only scored one more goal until the end of the campaign, with PSG finally finishing fourth.

In the summer of 2011, Paris Saint-Germain were purchased by Qatari investors and bought several new players, including Jérémy Menez with whom Nenê had played at Monaco. The Brazilian began the season hesitantly, struggling to accept that he had lost his star status in the team with the arrival of Javier Pastore. On 29 October, however, he scored two goals (both penalties) in a 4–2 home win against Stade Malherbe Caen, putting his team three points clear at the top of the table.

Nenê scored his first hat-trick with PSG on 13 May 2012, netting all of the game's goals in the home fixture against Stade Rennais F.C. in only 18 minutes of play. He finished the campaign as the league's second top scorer, helping his side to the second place and direct qualification to the UEFA Champions League.

Al-Gharafa
On 15 January 2013, after having appeared in 112 official matches with PSG (but only nine in the league in the first half of the season), Nenê moved to Al-Gharafa SC in the Qatar Stars League. In March, he was suspended for nine games and fined €67,000 for fighting with Houssine Kharja, being eventually released in late January of the following year.

West Ham United

On 18 February 2015, free agent Nenê signed for West Ham United until the end of the campaign. He made his debut ten days later in a 1–3 home defeat by Crystal Palace by coming on as a 61st minute substitute for Alex Song, and was released at the end of the season following an unsuccessful stint at the Hammers.

São Paulo
On 26 January 2018, the 36-year-old Nenê agreed to a two-year contract with São Paulo. In an interview held the previous December, he claimed to have been a supporter of the club as a child. He scored his first goal for his new team on 7 February, in a 1–0 win over Bragantino for the Campeonato Paulista.

Fluminense
After being released, on 15 July 2019 Nenê joined Fluminense until the end of the 2020 season. In the first two months of that year, he scored seven goals across all competitions.

Personal life / Sponsorship
In October 2012, Nenê was named an ambassador in France for the game FIFA 13, alongside Karim Benzema and Lionel Messi. In 2010, he signed a deal with Adidas.

Each year, Nenê organised with fellow footballer Neymar a charity match in his hometown of Jundiaí, with the purpose of raising money for food for families in need.

Career statistics

Honours

Club
Paulista
Campeonato Brasileiro Série C: 2001
Campeonato Paulista Série A2: 2001

Paris Saint-Germain
Ligue 1: 2012–13

Vasco da Gama
Campeonato Carioca: 2016

Fluminense
Taça Rio: 2020

Individual
Ligue 1 Best Foreign Player: 2009–10
Ligue 1 Top Scorer: 2011–12 (joint)
 UNFP Ligue 1 Team of the Year: 2010–11, 2011–12
Campeonato Carioca Best Player: 2016
Campeonato Carioca Team of the Year: 2020

References

External links
 
 
 
 French League profile 

1981 births
Living people
Footballers from São Paulo (state)
Naturalised citizens of Spain
Brazilian footballers
Association football wingers
Campeonato Brasileiro Série A players
Campeonato Brasileiro Série C players
Paulista Futebol Clube players
Sociedade Esportiva Palmeiras players
Santos FC players
CR Vasco da Gama players
São Paulo FC players
Fluminense FC players
La Liga players
Segunda División players
RCD Mallorca players
Deportivo Alavés players
RC Celta de Vigo players
RCD Espanyol footballers
Ligue 1 players
AS Monaco FC players
Paris Saint-Germain F.C. players
Qatar Stars League players
Al-Gharafa SC players
Premier League players
West Ham United F.C. players
Brazilian expatriate footballers
Expatriate footballers in Spain
Expatriate footballers in Monaco
Expatriate footballers in France
Expatriate footballers in Qatar
Expatriate footballers in England
Brazilian expatriate sportspeople in Spain
Brazilian expatriate sportspeople in Monaco
Brazilian expatriate sportspeople in France
Brazilian expatriate sportspeople in Qatar
Brazilian expatriate sportspeople in England